Blaker is a surname.
Ashley Blaker
Edward Blaker, English MP for New Shoreham
Blaker baronets
Peter Blaker, Baron Blaker, English Conservative politician
Reginald Blaker, British Conservative politician
Dick Blaker, British cricketer also known as R. N. R. Blaker
Roderick Blaker

See also
Blaker (disambiguation)